North West FM (also known as Radio North West) is a South African Commercial radio station based in Rustenburg in the North West Province.

Changes
Debbie Williams was appointed as the brand manager effective from 1 September 2012. Mr. David Tsutsa Mabusela was appointed station manager in 2013.

On 1 December 2012 a new Programme Manager, Mathapelo Monaisa, was appointed to the station. She later resigned in 2013 and joined Kaya FM as Bob Mabena's Producer. Mr Patrick Maloyi was then appointed as the programmes manager until late 2014 when he resigned as well.

Coverage Areas & Frequencies 
The station broadcasts in these areas and in FM on the following frequencies throughout South Africa. The station is also now available to neighbouring Pretoria

Pretoria 103.9

Broadcast languages
English
Tswana

Broadcast time
24/7

Target audience
LSM Groups 6 – 10
Age Group 25 - 49
Educated middle class adults

Programme format
60% Music
40% Talk
80% Setswana 
20% English

Listenership figures

Location
The station's physical address is:
Unit 1, Delta Place, Mabe Business Park, 17 Kgwebo Avenue, Rustenburg

References

External links
North West FM Website
North West FM Facebook Page
North West FM Listen Live
SAARF Website
Sentech Website

Radio stations in South Africa
Mass media in Rustenburg